Henry-Vernon House is a historic home located near Bushy Fork, Person County, North Carolina.  The earliest section was built in 1854, and is a two-story, Greek Revival style frame structure, with a one-story ell.  In 1896, a Queen Anne style frame wing was added to the front of the house.  Also on the property are two log tobacco barns, a corn crib, and a granary, all contributing buildings.

The house was added to the National Register of Historic Places in 1983.

References

Houses on the National Register of Historic Places in North Carolina
Greek Revival houses in North Carolina
Queen Anne architecture in North Carolina
Houses completed in 1854
Houses in Person County, North Carolina
National Register of Historic Places in Person County, North Carolina